SBI Youth for India (SBI YFI) is an Indian rural fellowship programme initiated, funded and managed by the State Bank of India (SBI) in partnership with reputed NGOs. The selected fellows work with experienced NGOs on challenging grass root development projects.

The fellowship is an initiative to sensitize and provide avenues for the more privileged sections to become aware of ground realities and contribute through their personal efforts towards building strong cohesive communities; a pre-requisite for a stable socio-political environment, which in turn would lead to economic regeneration. The focus of the fellowship has been in generating interest of the educated youth towards the social sector and in incubating the spirit of social entrepreneurship.

History 

The SBI Youth for India Fellowship was launched on 1 March 2011, in partnership with three reputed NGOs: M.S.Swaminathan Research Foundation, BAIF Development Research Foundation and Seva Mandir. All the three NGOs have more than two decades of experience in the development sector.

The second batch was launched in September 2014 comprising 51 fellows. Currently the seventh batch is running with 52 fellows across 10 NGO's in India.

The fellowship and its work has been appreciated by eminent personalities like Dr. A.P.J. Abdul Kalam (ex-President of India), Mr. Ratan Tata (Chairman, Tata Group), D.S. Subbarao (Governor, Reserve Bank of India), Mrs. Rajashree Birla (Director of the Aditya Birla Group of Companies), Mr. O. P. Bhatt (Chairman, State Bank of India), and Professor M.S. Swaminathan (the proponent of the Green Revolution in India) amongst others.

Partner NGOs 

The SBI Youth for India fellowship works with 14 eminent NGOs as partners namely

 BAIF Development Research Foundation
 Dhan Foundation
 Gram Vikas
 Chirag 
 Seva Mandir
 Sewa Bharat
 MSSRF
 RGVN
 AKRSP-I
 Barefoot College SWRC
 Action for Social Advancement (ASA)
 Samaj Pragati Sahayog (SPS)
 Urmul
 the ant

Thematic Areas 

The SBI Youth for India fellows work on diverse projects in 12 broad thematic program areas:

 Education
 Food Security
 Environmental Protection
 Health
 Alternate Energy
 Rural Livelihoods
 Traditional Crafts
 self-governance
 Social Entrepreneurship
 Women's Empowerment
 Water
 Technology

The SBI Youth for India Fellows 
The Fellows range between 21–32 years of age and they come from all parts of India. Adequate representation of all geographical regions of the country and of gender is achieved through a stringent selection criterion that ensures the quality of the fellows with only approximately 1 out of every 100 applicants being selected. The SBI Youth for India fellows are all graduates or postgraduates including alumni of eminent institutes such as the Indian Institute of Technology, Indian Institute of Management, BITS - Pilani, NIFT, CEPT University, foreign universities and others. Most of the professionals have an engineering or management background although there are many with diverse background in biotechnology, urban planning, law, mathematics, and agricultural science. The Fellows have worked in a range of sectors including information technology, education, infrastructure, non-profit, healthcare and others and at leading organisations such as Tata Group, Cap Gemini, IBM, Mindtree, among many others.

The flagship batch of the fellowship had 27 fellows selected out of about 4000 applicants, who worked for a year on various projects in the areas of agricultural supply chain and linkages, education, public policy and awareness, rural tourism, tribal development and environment in eight states and union territories (namely, Rajasthan, Maharashtra, Kerala, Orissa, Gujarat, Karnataka, Tamil Nadu and Puducherry).

Every SBI Youth For India Fellow has the responsibility of ensuring that his project makes a positive impact on the community. It begins by planning a project, defining the expected outcomes and laying the road map to achieve it, with guidance of the mentors from partner NGOs.

Alumni

Notable Work

Shuvajit Payne from the 2011 batch is currently Head of Education at Barefoot College
Satwik Mishra and Komal Ramdey implented Garima Abhiyan' in Simdega which was country's first-ever district-wide MHM Awareness drive under which all 450 Villages of the district were covered.
Shriti Pandey is the Founder of Strawcture ECO. She was featured in Forbes 30 under 30 list of Forbes in 2021.
Grusha Victor of 2018-19 batch for her work on marketing indigenous brews was covered on The Pune Mirror
Saloni Sacheti, SBI Youth for India Fellow, Batch 2017-18 worked on promoting a bamboo-based village enterprise and has Founded Baansuli. She made it in the Forbes 30 under 30 Asia list for 2021.
Sunayna Chattrapati (SBI YFI 2014-15) currently works as Deputy Diredctor in Makal Jagruti
Pratibha Krishnaiah has founded Himalayan Blooms
Simran Grover is the Founder of Bask Research Foundation
Piyush Kuhikar(2016–17) is the Founder of BitHelp Foundation

Alumni Network 
The fellowship has a strong network of more than 303 alumni.

YFI Annual Meet

YFI Annual Meet is a 2-day affair centered around celebrating the spirit of Fellowship.The program includes release of the Coffee Table Book (CTB) of the previous batch, Round-Table meeting of Partner NGOs, showcasing the work of our alumni, a Youth Conclave with panel discussion followed by networking with more than 100 external guests who attend the youth conclave.

Other Fellowship in India
ICICI foundation of ICICI Bank had started 2 years fellowship program in year 2010, continued in 2011 and selections are underway for ICICI Fellows 2012.
Reliance Foundation of RIL had also started the DARE fellowship in 2011.
In 2012, Prime Minister Rural Development Fellowship(PMRDF) has also been started with the help of Tiss by Ministry of Rural Development, India to promote the youth involvement in Country's major problems.

References

External links
 SBI Youth for India Official Site
 Blog on Background of SBI YFI Fellows
 Official Video Documenting the Experiences of SBI YFI Fellows
 Ratan Tata, Chairman, Tata Group on SBI YFI
 O.P. Bhatt, Chairman, State Bank of India on SBI YFIWork of SBI YFI Fellow on NREGA Awareness
 Work of SBI YFI Fellow on Education
 Work of SBI YFI Fellow on BioVillage Model
 Project-Synopsis of SBI YFI Fellows
Experiences of SBI YFI Fellows
SBI Recruitment for 8000 clerk posts (Junior Associate posts) - 2020
SBI Officers Recruitment 2020

State Bank of India
Indian youth culture
2011 establishments in Maharashtra
Rural development in India